Marceau Fourcade (26 January 1905 – after 1936) was a French rower who competed in the 1936 Summer Olympics.

In 1936 he won the bronze medal as crew member of the French boat in the coxed pairs event.

External links
 profile

1905 births
Year of death missing
French male rowers
Olympic rowers of France
Rowers at the 1936 Summer Olympics
Olympic bronze medalists for France
Olympic medalists in rowing
Medalists at the 1936 Summer Olympics
20th-century French people